The 1910 Auckland Rugby League season was the first season where a full organised competition was played following the 1909 season where several exhibition club matches were played. The competition celebrated its 100th anniversary in 2010 and is currently in its 109th season. The 1910 season commenced on 14 May, with the start of the competition for the Myers Cup. It involved four teams, City Rovers, Newton Rangers, North Shore Albions, and Ponsonby United. Only Ponsonby United (now known as Ponsonby Ponies) still survive to the present day.

Two venues were used. Victoria Park, in downtown Auckland hosted 12 matches, and Takapuna Racecourse which no longer exists, hosted 4 matches.

Meetings and news

ARL annual meeting 
At the Auckland Rugby League annual meeting the following committee was elected:Chairman, Mr B Brigham; Hon Secretary, Mr A. J. Powley; hon treasurer, Mr Percy Usher; hon auditors, Mr D. W. MacLean and E. W. Watts; president, Mr C. D. Grey; vice-presidents, Mr F. E. N. Gaudin, M. Molloy, W. T. Thompson, J. Patterson, W. M. Evans, T. Craig, A. E. Glover MP, T. Buxton. At the meeting information was received that two new clubs were forming, one in the city and the other at a marine suburb.

City Rovers Establishment 
On 12 April a meeting was held at the Waitemata Hotel with a view to forming a club. There were 23 people in attendance with Mr. D. W. MacLean occupying the chair. It was decided that a club would be formed called City Rovers. The following were elected as officers: president, Mr. J Endean; vice-presidents, Mr F. E. N. Gaudin; Graham, A. J. Parker, and W. M. Evans; hon secretary, Mr L. E. Hinton; hon treasurer, Mr Ernest Asher; hon auditor, Mr B. Brigham. Players for the team were requested to travel to the North Shore on the following Saturday to practice with the North Shore Albions team. The match resulted in a draw with both teams scoring three tries each.

Newton Rangers
On the evening of 5 May Newton held a meeting at the Caledonian Hotel with Mr. W. Mulholland presiding. Twenty one playing members were present "and much enthusiasm was shown". The following officers were elected:- President, Mr. J.J. Molloy; vice-presidents, Messrs. W. Jones, J.E. Hunt, J. Fernandez, H. McNeil, R. Gordon, E. Hall Skelton, R. Robinson, J. Boonstra, D. Simpson, F.E. Baume, M.P., and A. Raynes; captain, Mr. William Mackrell; vice-captain Samuel B. Houghton; hon. secretary, Mr. G. Smith; treasurer, Mr. W. Mulholland; auditors, Messrs. M. Hooper and E.W. Watts; management committee, Messrs. Bradburn, Hooper, Samuel Houghton, Farrant, Winter, Smith, and Mulholland; delegates to Auckland league, Messrs. Linkhorn, Smith, and Mulholland; delegate on management committee of Auckland league, Mr. P. Linkhorn; selectors, Messrs. Mackrell, Houghton, and Bradburn. The club decided to adopt the colours of maroon and white. Samuel Houghton was the son of Joseph Houghton, the former chairman of Northern Union before the family migrated to New Zealand.

Northcote Ramblers join the Northern Union Code 
On 15 April a meeting was held at Northcote to form a rugby league club there. There were 37 players and supporters present. Mr. D. W. MacLean chaired the meeting. 21 players enrolled at the new club. Mr Lepper was appointed hon secretary, and Mr A. Jackson treasurer. The club was initially to be called the Northcote Warriors however within a week this was changed to the Northcote Ramblers which they were known as for decades afterwards. Today the club is known as the Northcote Tigers. The team played their first ever match on 23 April when they took on a combined Newton Rangers and Ponsonby United junior team in Northcote. The home team won by 18 points to 8 with Jack Stanaway refereeing.

Myers Cup (First Grade Championship)
Sixteen matches were played until the final round on 20 August where City Rovers defeated Ponsonby United to become the inaugural champions of Auckland club Rugby League (which at this time was referred to as 'Northern Union' in the media). The Round 4 match between North Shore and City won by City 12–6 did not have the point scorers reported. In the Round 6 match between Ponsonby and City the match was abandoned after Albert Opai Asher led the City team off the field after protesting the non awarding of a 'try' to the City team. After an inquiry by the league during the week Asher apologised.

Senior competition

Final standings
{|
|-
|

Results

Round 1 
The North Shore v City match was played on the Takapuna Racecourse.

Round 2

Round 3

Round 4

Round 5

Round 6 
Arthur Thompson Haddon had recently joined the North Shore Albions team. It was said that he had recently played the game in the "Old Country". Future Kiwi, Joe Bennett was also on debut for Newton Rangers. He had played a few seasons of rugby for Waiuku and club teams in that area before moving to Auckland. After one match for the City Rugby Club a few weeks earlier he switched codes. He impressed in his first match of the new code with 3 tries in their 16-5 win over North Shore.

Round 7

Round 8

Top scorers
The Round 4 match between North Shore and City won by City 12–6 did not have the point scorers reported so the following lists are unlikely to be 100% complete.

Second grade
A second grade competition was also played, however it received little coverage in the news media. It featured second teams from City Rovers, North Shore Albions and Ponsonby United, as well as a team from Northcote named the Northcote & Birkenhead Ramblers. Northcote were to go through the season undefeated to win the grade.

On 6 June Northcote beat Ponsonby by default and North Shore beat City 12–6. On 25 June Northcote beat City 5–3.

The points table was published in The New Zealand Herald on 3 August. There had been two rounds of play scheduled for 13 and 20 August however it appears they were not played and the final table remained as follows.

Auckland Rugby League seasons
Auckland Rugby League
Rugby league in Auckland